Golriz Ghahraman  (born 1981) is an Iranian-born New Zealand politician, member of Parliament, and author. The former United Nations lawyer was a child asylum seeker, and became the first refugee elected to New Zealand's Parliament. Ghahraman is a member of the New Zealand House of Representatives for the Green Party.

Early life and education
Ghahraman was born in Iran in 1981. Her family lived in Mashhad, Iran's second largest city, where her father, an agricultural engineer, worked for the Ministry of Agriculture on the research and development of plant-based alternative fuels. Her mother studied as a child psychologist but was ethically opposed to "psychologists having to pledge allegiance to a religion" so refused to sit the Islamic examinations required for her to practice and never worked as such. Her father was Shia and her mother a Kurdish Sunni, though neither parent was religious.

In 1990, following the end of the Iran–Iraq War, nine-year-old Ghahraman and her family left Iran for Malaysia, ostensibly for a holiday. From Malaysia they booked flights to Fiji, with a stopover in Auckland, where they sought political asylum and were accepted as refugees. Her parents later set up a restaurant and a gift shop in Auckland and did not work in their earlier areas of expertise.

Ghahraman attended Auckland Girls' Grammar School. She has a Bachelor of Laws and Bachelor of Arts in History from the University of Auckland, and a Master of Studies (MSt) degree in International Human Rights Law with Distinction from the University of Oxford.

Professional life

Ghahraman entered legal practice in New Zealand working as a junior barrister specialising in criminal defence, describing it as "the most frontline human rights area of law you can work in practice  New Zealand; every day you are applying the Bill of Rights Act and you’re dealing with unlawful detention, searches and discrimination."

Ghahraman worked as a lawyer for the United Nations as part of both the defence and prosecution teams with the tribunals in Rwanda, Cambodia and The Hague. She had worked on tribunals such as the International Criminal Tribunal for Rwanda, volunteering as an intern; and was assigned to the defence team. Her work on the defence teams of accused and convicted war criminals such as Radovan Karadžić and Simon Bikindi, has caused her controversy, although she has claimed transparency throughout.

Ghahraman returned to New Zealand in 2012 and worked as a barrister, specialising in human rights law and criminal defence. She appeared before the Supreme Court of New Zealand in a case which ultimately led to the police overhauling their rules about undercover operations.

Political career

Member of Parliament

Ghahraman was selected as a Green party list candidate in January 2017 for the 2017 general election. On the provisional results on election night the Greens did not attain a high enough party vote for Ghahraman to enter Parliament, though a slight increase for the Greens in the special vote would see her allocated a seat. After the Greens gained 0.5% of the vote in special votes she was duly elected to Parliament, in so doing becoming New Zealand's first refugee MP.

In November 2017, it was revealed that, along with prosecuting war criminals, Ghahraman had also volunteered as an intern for the legal defence team of accused war criminals such as Radovan Karadžić, as part of her work with the United Nations. She defended her role in this work, claiming that her role was necessary to "maintaining a fair and robust trial process," that she was "proud to have been involved in that tradition of fair and transparent international justice," and that, given the choice, she would "do it again".

In early March 2019, Ghahraman submitted her Electoral Strengthening Democracy Bill that proposes lowering the country's mixed member proportional (MMP) threshold from 5% to 4%. Both Winston Peters of the governing coalition member party New Zealand First and Simon Bridges of the opposition National Party criticised Ghahraman's bill as opportunistic. Ghahraman has also advocated giving prisoners the right to vote and banning foreign donations to political parties as part of her bill.

During the 2020 New Zealand election that was held on 17 October, Ghahraman contested Mount Roskill, coming third place behind Labour's Michael Wood and National's Parmjeet Parmar. She was re-elected to Parliament on the party list.

In mid–May 2022, Ghahraman's member's bill, the Electoral Strengthening Democracy Amendment Bill, was drawn from the ballot. Her bill proposed several changes including allowing Māori voters to switch electoral rolls at any time, giving all prisoners the right to vote, reducing the electoral threshold for entering Parliament from 5 percent to 4 percent, and lowering the voting age to 16 years. In early August 2022, Attorney-General David Parker expressed concern that the Bill's donation cap could potentially breach the right to free speech.

Views and positions

David Seymour controversy
In mid-May 2019, ACT Party leader David Seymour generated some criticism when he stated in a radio interview that Ghahraman was a "menace to freedom in [New Zealand]".  This statement drew immediate responses from all sides of the New Zealand Parliament and the general public in strong condemnation of Seymour.  The consensus among opponents of Seymour's statements appeared to be that the implicit equating earlier in the interview of Ghahraman with authoritarian figures such as Adolf Hitler and Mao Zedong was completely spurious.

Human rights
Ghahraman spoke out against United States President Donald Trump's travel ban, saying in 2017: "I wouldn't travel to America right now. I wouldn't want to face what people are facing – held in handcuffs and being interrogated by security forces, [...] I wouldn't want that [border detention] for anyone."

She believes representation for women and minorities in politics is important: "Ultimately the sinister face of populism is what really pushed me over the edge to run as a candidate.  The hate speech became scary. I knew that representation is important. I knew that to stop the very real attacks against minorities and women, we had to get really active, to support each other, and forge paths. We have to become leaders ourselves."

In early March 2019, Ghahraman suggested that the New Zealand Government cooperate with any potential Kurdish and United Nations process to bring home captured New Zealand Jihadist Mark John Taylor, who had joined the Islamic State in 2014.

Israel–Palestine
In mid-July 2019, Ghahraman was accused of anti-Semitism by New Zealand Jewish Council spokesperson Juliet Moses after she published a tweet on 11 July describing Mary and Joseph as Palestinian refugees. Moses alleged that Ghahraman was denying the Jewish connection to the land by not recognising Jesus was Jewish. Ghahraman apologised that her comments had offended the Jewish community, thanking the Jewish community for their support for refugees. A Green Party spokesperson responded that Golriz had apologised for her "poorly worded remarks" and said that Ghahraman was going to work with Jewish communities to improve dialogue. In response, left-wing blogger Martyn "Bomber" Bradbury defended Ghahraman and the Green Party from accusations of anti-Semitism, arguing that this was an attempt to deflect from Israel's "occupation" of Palestinian land.

In December 2020, Ghahraman joined fellow Green MP Teanau Tuiono and Labour MP Ibrahim Omer in pledging to form a new parliamentary Palestine friendship group to "raise the voices of Palestinian peoples in the New Zealand Parliament" during an event organised by the Wellington Palestine advocacy group to mark "International Day of Solidarity with the Palestinians."

In response to the 2021 Israel–Palestine crisis, Ghahraman criticised what she regarded as the New Zealand Government's slow response in issuing a statement on the conflict. She also criticised Israel for encouraging "very violent systemic attacks" on the Palestinian population in East Jerusalem and bombarding Gaza. In response, the New Zealand Jewish Council accused Ghahraman of misrepresenting the Sheik Jarrah dispute and ignoring Hamas' rocket attacks on Israeli, which in their view made her unfit to serve as the Greens' foreign affairs spokesperson.

On 19 May, Ghahraman sponsored a motion calling for Members of Parliament to recognise the right of Palestinians to self-determination and statehood. The motion was supported by the Greens and the Māori Party but was opposed by the centre-right National and ACT parties. The governing Labour Party also declined to support the Greens' motion with the Speaker of the House Trevor Mallard criticising Ghahraman for sponsoring the motion despite knowing that it was going to be voted down.

In response to criticism by ACT Party deputy leader Brooke Van Velden, Ghahraman also defended fellow Green MP Ricardo Menéndez March's tweet that said: "From the river to the sea, Palestine will be free!" Ghahraman claimed that March was defending the rights of both Arabs and Jews to having equal rights in their homeland.

Religious beliefs 
Ghahraman describes herself as "agnostic—some days I would say atheist", noting that "It was important for me to get up and say I’m actually not religious at all, because the Middle East also has diversity within it".

Personal life 
Ghahraman revealed that she has multiple sclerosis in an interview in February 2020.

She was in a relationship with comedian Guy Williams, which ended in late 2020.

Bibliography

Non-fiction 
 Know Your Place (2020)

References

External links 

 Green Party profile

Members of the New Zealand House of Representatives
Green Party of Aotearoa New Zealand MPs
New Zealand officials of the United Nations
Khmer Rouge Tribunal prosecutors
Alumni of the University of Oxford
University of Auckland alumni
Iranian refugees
Refugees in New Zealand
21st-century New Zealand women politicians
New Zealand women writers
Women members of the New Zealand House of Representatives
New Zealand list MPs
Politicians of Iranian descent
People from Mashhad
Human rights lawyers
New Zealand women lawyers
New Zealand agnostics
New Zealand atheists
Living people
1981 births
People educated at Auckland Girls' Grammar School
Criminal defense lawyers
People with multiple sclerosis
Candidates in the 2020 New Zealand general election
Iranian emigrants to New Zealand
New Zealand people of Kurdish descent
21st-century New Zealand lawyers